Saleh Abdelaziz Alhaddad (born 7 April 1986) is a Kuwaiti track and field athlete who specialises in the long jump. He holds the Kuwaiti records for the event with bests of  indoors and  outdoors. He also holds the national best for the 60 metres, with his time of 6.78 seconds. He represented Kuwait at the global level at the 2008 IAAF World Indoor Championships and the 2003 World Youth Championships in Athletics.

Al-Haddad has had international success at regional and continental level. His best results were silver medals at the 2006 Asian Games and 2007 Asian Athletics Championships. He has won a medal of each colour during his career at the Asian Indoor Athletics Championships (with a gold coming in 2014). He has had podium finishes in regional events including the Pan Arab Games, Arab Athletics Championships, West Asian Games and GCC Athletics Championships.

Career
He represented his country at the 2003 World Youth Championships in Athletics and competed in the long jump, triple jump and in the Swedish medley relay. He was the winner of the long jump at the Arab Junior Athletics Championships the following year.

Al-Haddad began competing at senior level in 2005 and won several medals in his first such season: he was the bronze medallist at the Gulf Cooperation Council Athletics Championships and the 2005 Arab Athletics Championships, the gold medallist at the 2005 West Asian Games, and eighth at the higher level 2005 Asian Athletics Championships. He also helped the Kuwaiti 4×400 metres relay team to fourth place at the Asian Indoor Games. More indoor success followed three months later at the 2006 Asian Indoor Athletics Championships, where he was the bronze medallist in the long jump, but failed to finish in the relay event. He also represented Kuwait in the 4×100 metres relay at the meeting, but the team failed to finish.

He won two medals in 2007: a bronze at the Arab Championships and a silver at the Asian Championships He was two centimetres short of a medal at the 2007 Asian Indoor Games, taking fourth behind Konstantin Safronov. This earned him qualification for the 2008 IAAF World Indoor Championships, but he did progress beyond the qualifying round. He was third at the GCC Championships, but came only seventh at the 2009 Asian Athletics Championships and fifth at the Asian Indoor Games. His sole international outing of 2010 was a bronze medal performance at the West Asian Athletics Championships.

Al-Haddad won his first major regional gold medals at the 2011 GCC Games and the 2011 Pan Arab Games. He did not compete for 18 months and on his return took a bronze medal at the 2013 Islamic Solidarity Games.

References

External links

Living people
1986 births
Kuwaiti male long jumpers
Athletes (track and field) at the 2006 Asian Games
Athletes (track and field) at the 2014 Asian Games
Athletes (track and field) at the 2018 Asian Games
Asian Games medalists in athletics (track and field)
Asian Games silver medalists for Kuwait
Medalists at the 2006 Asian Games
Islamic Solidarity Games medalists in athletics